Hesperocharis graphites, the marbled white or Mexican marbled white, is a butterfly in the family Pieridae. It is found in Mexico, Guatemala and Nicaragua. It is found in montane habitats, including cloud forests, open pastures and páramo grassland.

Subspecies
The following subspecies are recognised:
Hesperocharis graphites graphites (Guatemala)
Hesperocharis graphites avivolans (Butler, 1865) (Mexico)

References

Anthocharini
Butterflies described in 1864
Páramo fauna
Taxa named by Henry Walter Bates
Butterflies of North America
Butterflies of Central America